Phi Rho Eta  is a nationally incorporated, fraternity that was founded on August 22, 1994, at Southern Illinois University in Carbondale, Illinois. The founders are LaMont Taylor and Marvin Randolph.

Phi Rho Eta is based on three principles: pride, respect, and excellence through community development, academics, and social interactions.

History
The founders, Marvin Randolph and Lamont Taylor, were raised in neighborhoods that overflowed with the social diseases of drugs, violence, poverty, and hopelessness. Randolph and Taylor met as brothers of the Zeta Nu chapter of Alpha Phi Omega, and while there determined the ideas and implementation for Phi Rho Eta. The founders had an idea to establish an organization on the premise that it would promote the principles of pride, respect, and excellence. They sought to form a brotherhood that would work to set the standard of manhood, an organization comprising charismatic men striving to model and teach exemplary positive behavior.

Since its founding date, Phi Rho Eta has striven to benefit the community. Phi Rho Eta is concentrated in the Midwest but has plans to expand. , Phi Rho Eta has not become a member of any national fraternity council such as the National Pan-Hellenic Council or North American Interfraternity Conference.

National programs
The national philanthropy of the fraternity is the Mentor Teacher Brother program (MTB).  Mentor Teacher Brother is the polestar community development program of Phi Rho Eta. As the name illustrates, MTB revolves around the core concepts of mentorship, learning, and brotherhood. The program is designed to cultivate positive principles and attributes through one on one interaction, group learning, and unity.

Chapters
Phi Rho Eta has both undergraduate and graduate chapters.

Undergraduate chapters
 Alpha - Southern Illinois University Carbondale
 Beta - Chicago State University - Citywide
 Gamma - University of Illinois at Urbana–Champaign
 Delta - University of Louisville Inactive 
 Epsilon - Eastern Illinois University
 Zeta - Northern Illinois University

Colonies
Western Illinois University
West Virginia State University
University of Missouri

Graduate chapters
 Eta Alpha - Chicago Alumni
 Eta Beta - University of Illinois at Urbana–Champaign Graduate chapter

Membership

New members of the fraternity are accepted on both undergraduate and graduate levels.

Membership intake
The intake period is what a potential member of the fraternity engages in before being initiated as a member. This period is the time the potential member learns of the organization's history, principles and tenacity of brotherhood. The process is designed to develop brotherhood and transition new members into their roles as charismatic members of Phi Rho Eta.

Stance on hazing
Hazing is against the fraternity's official policy. There is a zero tolerance against any kind of hazing. Individuals involved in hazing face severe disciplinary action by the fraternity and authorities.

See also
List of African American Greek & Fraternal Organizations
List of social fraternities and sororities

References

External links

Phi Rho Eta's Message Board

Student organizations established in 1994
1994 establishments in Illinois
International student societies
Student societies in the United States
Southern Illinois University Carbondale
African-American fraternities and sororities